Amirabad-e Olya or Amir Abad Olya may refer to:
 Amir Abad Olya, Hamadan
 Amirabad-e Olya, Kerman
 Amirabad-e Olya, Kohgiluyeh and Boyer-Ahmad